Dumra is a town and a notified area authority in Sitamarhi district, Bihar, India.

Dumra may also refer to:

 Dumra, Dhanbad, a census town in Baghmara, Dhanbad district, India
 Dumra, Sitamarhi district, Bihar, India
 MV Dumra, a British cargo vessel shipwrecked in 1943
 A region of Ladakh, better known as Nubra
 Another name for Amri language, spoken in Assam, India
 An historical name for Durbuk, Ladakh, India

See also
 
 Dimra, a former Palestinian village